Ruth Linn is a professor in the Department of Counseling and Human Development at the University of Haifa. Specializing in moral psychology, she has focused on moral disobedience, including resistance to authority.

Linn is the author of five books, including Not Shooting and Not Crying: Psychological Inquiry into Moral Disobedience (1989); Conscience at War: the Israeli Soldier as a Moral Critic (1996); and Escaping Auschwitz: A Culture of Forgetting (2004).

Education
Born in Israel, Linn attended the Hebrew Reali School in Haifa, after which she was conscripted, in 1968 aged 18, into the Israel Defence Forces. She obtained her doctorate in education (EdD) from Boston University in 1981.

Career

Positions held
Linn taught in the Faculty of Education at the University of Haifa from 1982, and from 2001 to 2006 served as its dean. She has held visiting scholarships at Harvard University, the University of Maryland, the University of British Columbia, and the National Institute of Mental Health.

Auschwitz research
In 1998, Linn arranged for the University of Haifa to award an honorary doctorate to Rudolf Vrba, who escaped from the Auschwitz concentration camp in April 1944, in recognition of his escape and his contribution to Holocaust education. She also arranged for the University of Haifa Press to publish Vrba's memoirs and the Vrba–Wetzler report in Hebrew. Linn subsequently wrote Escaping Auschwitz (2004), a book about Vrba.

Awards
Linn was awarded the Erikson Award by the International Society of Political Psychology in 1990 for her work on Israeli soldiers and conscientious objection.

Personal life
Linn is married with three children.

Selected works

 (1989). 
 (1996). 
 (2002). 
 (2004). 
 (2004). "Voice, silence and memory after Auschwitz". In Lentin, R. (ed.). Representing the Shoah for the 21st Century. Oxford and New York: Berghahn Books. 
 (2008). "Between the 'Known' and the 'Could be Known': The case of the escape from Auschwitz". In Christina Guenther and Beth Griech-Polelle (eds.). Trajectories of Memory: Intergenerational Representations of the Holocaust in History and the Arts. Newcastle: Cambridge Scholars Publishing. 15–40. 
 (2011). "Rudolf Vrba and the Auschwitz reports: Conflicting historical interpretations". In Randolph L. Braham and W. J. vanden Heuvel (eds.). The Auschwitz Reports and the Holocaust in Hungary. New York: Columbia University Press, 153–210. 
 (2016) with Esther Dror. איך קרה ששרדת. (How Did You Survive). Tel Aviv: Hakibbutz Hameuchad Publications (Hebrew).

References

External links
"Prof. Ruth Linn". University of Haifa.
"'Yom Kippur War – 40 Years Later'. Conference: Dr. Ruth Linn". Institute of Israel Studies, 22 November 2013.

1950 births
Boston University School of Education alumni
Hebrew Reali School alumni
Israeli non-fiction writers
Israeli women academics
Living people
Moral psychologists
Academic staff of the University of Haifa